Demographic Research is a monthly peer-reviewed, open access academic journal covering demography. It was established in 1999 and is published by Max Planck Institute for Demographic Research. The editor-in-chief is Jakub Bijak (University of Southampton). According to the Journal Citation Reports, the journal has a 2016 impact factor of 1.320.

References

External links

Publications established in 1999
Demography journals
Monthly journals
English-language journals